Gandhi Smriti railway station is a small railway station on the Western Railway network in the state of Gujarat, India. Gandhi Smriti railway station is 3 km away from Navsari railway station. Passenger and MEMU trains halt here.

History

There is a railway gate between Navsari and Dandi on the way to Dandi. It is mostly closed due to high traffic. Gandhi Smriti railway station is located right next to it. Gandhi Smriti railway station is associated with Gandhiji's memories. Therefore, it is named as "Gandhi Smriti".

After the Dandi March started from Sabarmati Ashram on 12 March 1930, Gandhiji spent 14 April to 4 May in a hut built under a plum tree in Karadi village near Dandi. He now had to travel from Karadi to the salt field of Dharasana. The British police arrested him from Karadi on 4 May. Gandhiji was brought from Karadi to Hansapore. Frontier Mail was stopped at 1.30 in the night to take it by train to Mumbai. The surrounding villages had fought in memory of that day and as a result "Gandhi Smriti railway station" was started on 15 August 1997.

References

See also
 Navsari district

Railway stations in Navsari district
Mumbai WR railway division